Tegbi is a small town in the Keta Municipal district of the Volta Region of Ghana.
It is mainly populated by Ewe people.

References 

Populated places in the Volta Region